Wörnitz is a municipality  in the district of Ansbach, in Bavaria, Germany. It is situated on the river Wörnitz, west of Ansbach.

References

Ansbach (district)